Gloria Filippi (born 28 May 1992) is an Italian archer. Born in Rovereto, she participated at the 2010 Summer Youth Olympics in Singapore. She was eliminated in the first round of the girls' event; she paired up with Anton Karoukin of Belarus and won gold in the mixed team event, defeating Zoi Paraskevopoulou of Greece and Gregor Rajh of Slovenia in the gold medal match.

References

Archers at the 2010 Summer Youth Olympics
Living people
1992 births
Italian female archers
Youth Olympic gold medalists for Italy
People from Rovereto
Sportspeople from Trentino
21st-century Italian women